Broad-banded frog may refer to:

 Broad-banded grass frog (Ptychadena mossambica), a frog in the family Ptychadenidae found in Africa
 Broad-banded grassland frog (Ptychadena bibroni), a frog in the family Ptychadenidae found in Africa